Sitting Target, also known as Screaming Target, is a 1972 British crime film directed by Douglas Hickox and mainly shot in various locations in London, including the Winstanley and York Road Estates. It stars Oliver Reed, Ian McShane and Jill St. John and was based on the 1970 novel by Laurence Henderson.

Plot
Harry Lomart, a convicted murderer, and Birdy Williams are convicts planning a breakout. Before the two men can abscond to another country,  Lomart gets word that his wife Pat has been having an affair with another man and has become pregnant.

The two men had made plans to lie low after their escape from jail, but Lomart decides to find and kill his wife and the man she has been seeing. A police inspector, Milton, is the man assigned to catch the two escaped convicts.

Cast
 Oliver Reed as Harry Lomart  
 Jill St. John as Pat Lomart  
 Ian McShane as Birdy Williams  
 Edward Woodward as Inspector Milton  
 Frank Finlay as Marty Gold  
 Freddie Jones as MacNeil  
 Jill Townsend as Maureen  
 Robert Beatty as Gun Dealer  
 Tony Beckley as Soapy Tucker  
 Mike Pratt as Prison Warder Accomplice  
 Robert Russell as First Prison Warder  
 Joe Cahill as Second Prison Warder  
 Robert Ramsey as Gun Dealer's Bodyguard 
 June Brown as Lomart's Neighbour

Production
Douglas Hickox was signed to direct in July 1971. Filming started in September 1971.

Due to restrictions about filming in British prisons, the prisons sequences were filmed in Kilmainham Gaol, Dublin. The Winstanley and York Road Estates in Battersea feature extremely prominently throughout the film as the setting for many of the action sequences of the main protagonist.

Soundtrack 
The soundtrack was composed by Stanley Myers. It was released by Finders Keepers Records in 2007.

Notes

External links

 New York Times review
Sitting Target at Trailers from Hell

1972 films
1972 crime drama films
1970s crime thriller films
Metro-Goldwyn-Mayer films
British crime thriller films
British films about revenge
Films based on British novels
Films directed by Douglas Hickox
Films scored by Stanley Myers
Films shot in London
British drama films
1970s English-language films
1970s British films